Starfish Software was founded in 1994 by Philippe Kahn and Sonia Lee, as a spin-off from the Simplify business unit from Borland and  Kahn's severance from Borland.  It was located in Santa Cruz, California.

Starfish developed intellectual property for device synchronization, especially for wireless devices. TrueSync was the first over-the-air synchronization system. Starfish was acquired by Motorola for $325 million in 1998.
The outspoken founding couple founded another company, LightSurf, in the same year, to develop mobile phone photograph technology.

In 2000, the company helped start the SyncML Initiative to standardize synchronization communication protocols.
In March 2003, Starfish was acquired by Pumatech in San Jose, California, which was headed by turn-around CEO Woodson Hobbs.
Pumatech later changed its name to Intellisync, and was acquired by Nokia in 2005.

References

Nokia assets
Software companies based in California
Companies based in Santa Cruz, California
Software companies established in 1994
American companies established in 1994
Technology companies disestablished in 2008
1994 establishments in California
2008 disestablishments in California
Defunct software companies of the United States